One Drop of Truth is the seventh studio album by The Wood Brothers, released on February 2, 2018.

Reception

The album has a rating of 84/100 on Metacritic based on 5 reviews.

References

2018 albums
The Wood Brothers albums